The Biak tiger (Parantica marcia) is a species of nymphalid butterfly in the Danainae subfamily. It is endemic to Biak in Indonesia.

References

Parantica
Butterflies of Indonesia
Endemic fauna of the Biak–Numfoor rain forests
Butterflies described in 1916
Taxonomy articles created by Polbot
Taxa named by James John Joicey
Taxa named by George Talbot (entomologist)